Oxyparna melanostigmata is a species of tephritid or fruit flies in the genus Oxyparna of the family Tephritidae.

Distribution
Kyrgyzstan, Mongolia.

References

Tephritinae
Insects described in 1990
Diptera of Asia